An election for the leadership of the Ulster Unionist Party (UUP) was held on 8 April 2017 at the party's Annual General Meeting. Elections are held each year, with the incumbent usually reelected unopposed. The 2017 contested election was triggered after incumbent Leader Mike Nesbitt, elected in 2012, announced following the 2017 Assembly election his intention to step down as party leader. While initially, Robin Swann and Steve Aiken were expected to run against each other (with candidacies by Doug Beattie, Robbie Butler and Roy Beggs Jr. also considered possible), in the end only Swann ran and was elected unopposed.

References

2017 elections in the United Kingdom
2017
2017 in British politics
2017 elections in Northern Ireland
Ulster Unionist Party leadership election